John Rosser (22 April 1862 – 25 December 1925) was an Australian cricketer. He played four first-class cricket matches for Victoria between 1882 and 1883.

See also
 List of Victoria first-class cricketers

References

External links
 

1862 births
1925 deaths
Australian cricketers
Victoria cricketers
Cricketers from Fremantle